"Simple Creed" is a song by alternative rock group Live, which was released as the first single from their 2001 album, V.  It features vocals by English rapper Tricky.

Chart performance
The song was not released as a single in the US, but peaked at No. 18 on the Billboard Modern Rock Tracks Chart and No. 11 on the Mainstream Rock Tracks Chart. "Simple Creed" also reached No. 4 in Belgium, No. 18 in The Netherlands and No. 43 in Australia.

Track listings

Australian and German CD singles
"Simple Creed" – 3:26
"Shit Towne" (Live Version) – 4:40
"Sparkle" (Live Version) – 5:26

Netherlands CD single
"Simple Creed" – 3:26
"Shit Towne" (Live Version) – 4:37

Music video
The music video for "Simple Creed" was directed by Marc Webb. It features the band performing the song outdoors, cut with footage of two men fighting as they are urged on by a crowd of onlookers. The fight ends as one of the combatants appears to see the error of his ways. He begins walking and is followed by a large group of young people. When the rap section begins, the video cuts to a young man in his living room watching Tricky perform his section of the song on TV. The band finish performing the song as the sun sets. The final shot is of the now very large group of young people standing behind the band members in a suburban street.

References

External links
Official band website
Official Music Video via Live's Vevo channel

Live (band) songs
2001 singles
Songs written by Ed Kowalczyk
2001 songs
Radioactive Records singles